{{speciesbox
| taxon = Froggattisca tipularia
| authority = (Gerstaecker, 1885)
| synonyms = Gymnocnemia tipularia Gerstaecker, 1885
Austrogymncicnemia tipularia (Gerstaecker, 1885) 

}}Froggattisca tipularia is a species of cave-dwelling antlion (or Myrmeleontidae), endemic to Queensland. the Northern Territory and New South Wales.

The species was first described as Gymnocnemia  tipularia in 1923 by Carl Eduard Adolph Gerstaecker.Gerstaecker, C.E.A. 1885. Zwei fernere Decaden Australischen Neuropteren Megaloptera. Mitteilungen aus dem Naturwissenschaftlichen Verein von Neu-Vorpommern und Rügen in Greifswald 16: 84-116 [publication dated 1884] [102]. 

Miller and Stange describe this species (and all Froggattisca species) as not being a true cave-dwelling antlion, because  not all life stages are confined to caves, and differentiate this species of Froggattisca from all other cave-dwelling Froggattisca'' by their having no tibial spurs, and by their larvae having no setae on the ventral side of the head.

References

Myrmeleontidae
Insects described in 1885